Felicia annectens is an annual plant of up to about  high, that is assigned to the family Asteraceae. The lower leaves are opposite and the higher leaves alternate. The bloated involucre consists of very broad, hairless bracts. These protect up to ten, short, bluish ray florets that encircle yellow, partly sterile disc florets. The species was considered extinct after no observations were made after 1915, but was rediscovered in the 21st century. It occurs in the Western Cape province of South Africa.

Description 
Its leaves are set oppositely lower on the stem and alternately higher on the stem.

In the center of each corolla are five anthers merged into a tube, through which the style grows when the floret opens, hoovering up the pollen on its shaft. At the tip of both style branches is a triangular appendage. Pappus is missing at the ray florets, but surrounding the base of the corolla of the disc florets are six to eight, up to 2 mm (0.1 in) long, quickly shunted pappus bristles. The cypselae of sterile flowers are stunted and hairless.

Differences with related species 
Felicia annectens is most related to Felicia bergeriana, but differs by the alternate leaves in the upper part of the stem, the very broad, hairless involucral bracts, and the fact that part of the disc florets are functionally, but not morphologically sterile.

Taxonomy 
William Henry Harvey was the first to describe this species in 1865, based on a specimen he had collected himself near Paarl in 1838, and called it Aster annectens. Jürke Grau in his 1973 Revision of the genus Felicia (Asteraceae) reassigned it to the genus Felicia, making the combination Felicia annectens. The species is considered to be part of the section Neodetris.

Distribution, habitat and ecology 
Felicia annectens was known in the 19th century from only five observations from Hopefield in the north, the northwest of the Cape Peninsula, near Paarl, and along the Sonderend River near Caledon. In the 21st century it was rediscovered in the upper Breede River valley west of Worcester.

Conservation 
The conservation status of Felicia annectens could not established in 2018 because there were too few data available. Science assumed it had gone extinct because no observations after 1915 had been made. A few observations were made in the 21st century however.

References

External links 
 Photos of Felicia annectens on iNaturalist
 Line drawing of Felicia annectens
 Distribution of Felicia annectens

annectens
Endemic flora of South Africa
Plants described in 1865